Masan Bay is a bay in Changwon, South Korea.

Bays of South Korea
Changwon